Francisco Nicasio Jiménez was a Cuban orchestra conductor and dance band director.

Life and career
Francisco Nicasio Jiménez worked in Trinidad, Las Villas, Cuba, in the early 19th century. He was the father of violinist José Julián Jiménez and grandfather of cellist Nicasio and pianist Lico Jiménez.  His granddaughters Inés and Arcadia Jiménez were singers.

References

19th-century American musicians
19th-century classical musicians
19th-century conductors (music)
African-American classical musicians
African-American conductors (music)
Afro-Cuban jazz musicians
American conductors (music)
American male conductors (music)
American entertainers of Cuban descent
Male jazz musicians